Richard John Vitale (born June 9, 1939), also known as "Dickie V", is an American basketball sportscaster. A former head coach in the college and professional ranks, he is well known for his 41-year tenure as a college basketball broadcaster for ESPN. He is known for catchphrases such as "This is awesome, baby!" and "diaper dandy" (outstanding freshman player), as well as his enthusiastic and colorful remarks during games. He has also written nine books, and appeared in several films.

Early life and education
Vitale was born in Passaic, New Jersey, and grew up in Garfield, New Jersey. He moved to East Paterson (now Elmwood Park) in his freshman year of high school. His father, John, was a piece work clothing press operator and had a second job as a security guard. His mother, Mae, worked in a factory as a seamstress and sewed coats until she suffered a stroke. 

Vitale graduated from East Rutherford High School, and in 1963, he graduated from Seton Hall University with a Bachelor of Science degree in business administration. He later earned a master's degree in education from Paterson State College.

Coaching

High school coaching
Vitale took his first job as a coach at an elementary school in Garfield, New Jersey in 1958.  Eventually he moved up to the high school level to become head coach at Garfield High School for one season, and then at East Rutherford High School (his alma mater), where he had a record of 131–47 from 1964 to 1971 and led his teams to two New Jersey state championships.

College coaching
In 1971, Vitale moved to Rutgers University as an assistant coach under head coach Dick Lloyd. He was named head coach at the University of Detroit on March 31, 1973. He took the Titans to the 32-team NCAA tournament in 1977. Vitale had a 78–30 record during his tenure at Detroit, which included a 21-game winning streak during the 1977 season. During that streak the Titans defeated the eventual champion Marquette, on the road, in Milwaukee, Wisconsin. Following the 1977 season, his fourth as Detroit head coach, Vitale was named the university's athletic director.

NBA coaching
Vitale left the Titans to become head coach of the Detroit Pistons on May 1, 1978, succeeding Bob Kauffman who had served as an interim following the dismissal of Herb Brown  months prior on December 15, 1977. He signed a 3‐year contract with a $100,000 annual salary and a new Cadillac. The Pistons finished with a 30–52 (.366) record in 1978–79. Vitale was hospitalized with stress related stomach issues during his first season on the bench in Detroit as the team struggled.  In his second year, on November 8, 1979, Pistons owner Bill Davidson came to Vitale's house and told him that the Pistons were making a coaching change. It was twelve games into the 1979–80 Detroit Pistons season, and with the Pistons off to a 4–8 start, Vitale was fired on November 8, 1979, with assistant coach Richie Adubato promoted to replace him on an interim basis. 

A significant reason for Vitale's downfall with the Pistons was the maneuver that brought Bob McAdoo to Detroit. M.L. Carr's decision to sign with Boston as a free agent in 1979 spawned a transaction in which the Pistons, with Vitale in charge of player personnel, entitled to compensation for Carr, demanded McAdoo, whom the Celtics were looking to unload due to injuries. The Pistons sent two 1980 first-round draft picks (in addition to Carr) to the Celtics in exchange for McAdoo in a combination free agent signing/trade. The Pistons would have the worst season in franchise history in 1979–80, and their pick would become the first overall pick in the 1980 draft. Boston then traded the two picks to the Warriors (who selected Joe Barry Carroll with the number 1 pick and Rickey Brown with the number 13 pick) in exchange for Robert Parish and the number 3 pick (Kevin McHale).

Head coaching record

College

NBA

|-
| style="text-align:left;"|Detroit
| style="text-align:left;"|
| 82||30||52|||| style="text-align:center;"|4th in Central||—||—||—||—
| style="text-align:center;"|Missed playoffs
|-
| style="text-align:left;"|Detroit
| style="text-align:left;"|
| 12||4||8|||| style="text-align:center;"|(fired)||—||—||—||—
| style="text-align:center;"|—
|- class="sortbottom"
| style="text-align:center;" colspan="2"|Career
| 94||34||60|||| ||—||—||—||—||

Broadcasting
Following his departure as coach of the Detroit Pistons, Scotty Connal gave Vitale his first TV opportunity at the then fledgling ESPN cable network. His first reaction to the job of broadcaster was "Absolutely no way. I know nothing about TV. I want to get back to where I belong and my spirit belongs." He was reluctant to accept the position but his wife Lorraine told him to "go on TV and have some fun", so Vitale accepted on a temporary basis until another coaching job became available. He called ESPN's first college basketball game on December 5, 1979, when DePaul defeated Wisconsin 90–77. His first play-by-play partner was Joe Boyle.

Vitale was not a natural at first for broadcasting. He missed his first-ever production meeting when he was walking the streets of Chicago. Also, he would talk while the producers were talking to him through his earpiece, during commercials, and while the play-by-play man was talking. Vitale himself was not sure if broadcasting would fit him. Connal, who had hired him, told him, "You have a quality we can't teach." Vitale did not understand this until many people wanted his autograph at the 1983 Final Four. He credits a lot of his success to working with Jim Simpson at the beginning of his career.

In 1985, after the American Broadcasting Company acquired ESPN, Vitale also began doing broadcasts on the ABC network.

In 1999, Vitale was featured in a series of thirty-second promo shorts for "Hoops Malone".  The shorts, which aired in heavy rotation on ESPN, were presented as a sitcom featuring Vitale, George Gervin and others, including a puppet called "O'Hoolix".  ESPN promoted "Hoops" with banners and other marketing premiums, with the idea of generating buzz about the show, but no actual episodes were ever produced.  Though this led to an offer for Vitale to do an actual sitcom, he turned down the opportunity.

In December 2002, Vitale called a St. Vincent – St. Mary's–Oak Hill Academy prep game, featuring then high school phenom LeBron James. He announced the game with Dan Shulman and NBA great Bill Walton.

By the 2004–05 season, Vitale was doing approximately 40 games a year.

Vitale is signed with ESPN through the 2022–23 college basketball season.

In February 2015, ESPN removed Vitale from covering Duke-UNC basketball. He had covered every Duke-UNC game televised by ESPN since 1979.

Vitale is a voter on the AP Top 25 men's basketball polls, the annual Naismith Award and the John Wooden Award.

Vitale called his first NBA game on television since the 1984 NBA playoffs, along with Dan Shulman, on January 7, 2009 when the Miami Heat played the Denver Nuggets as ESPN swapped its NBA and NCAA crews. During ESPN's first incarnation covering the NBA, he regularly covered games.

Broadcasting partners
As of 2009, Vitale had called close to a thousand games. Vitale, a color commentator, is primarily paired with play-by-play announcers Mike Patrick, primarily those in the ACC games; and Dan Shulman for Saturday Primetime and other non-ACC games. During the postseason, he appears as an in-studio analyst with host Rece Davis and fellow analysts Jay Bilas, Digger Phelps, Hubert Davis, and Bob Knight. Previously, he has been paired with Keith Jackson, Roger Twibell, and Brent Musburger for ABC as well as Jim Simpson, Tim Brando, Mike Tirico, Dave O'Brien, Sean McDonough and Brad Nessler. He worked in the studio with Bob Ley, John Saunders, Tirico, and Chris Fowler as well as Jim Valvano.

Awards and honors
Basketball
University of Detroit named their basketball court "Dick Vitale Court" in his honor (2011).

Broadcasting
2019 Sports Emmy Award – Lifetime Achievement

ESPY Awards
2022 Jimmy V Award

Halls of Fame
Naismith Memorial Basketball Hall of Fame inductee (class of 2008) 
College Basketball Hall of Fame inductee (class of 2008)
Little League Museum Hall of Excellence inductee (class of 2012).
NSMA Hall of Fame (class of 2013)
New Jersey Hall of Fame inductee (class of 2016).
Italian American Sports Hall of Fame (class of 2020).

Appearances in other media

Video games
Dick Vitale lent his name, voice and likeness to the 1994 Sega Genesis college basketball video game, Dick Vitale's "Awesome, Baby!" College Hoops, developed and sold by Time Warner Interactive and only released in the United States. Later, Vitale and Brad Nessler provided the commentator voices for EA Sports' NCAA Basketball (formerly NCAA March Madness) video game series until its 2010 discontinuation.

Books
In 2004, Vitale released a descriptive autobiography co-written with Dick Weiss, entitled Living a Dream. The book has several thoughts and comments on his days with the Pistons and ESPN, and memories of former NC State basketball Coach Jim Valvano.

Product endorsements
Vitale has appeared in commercials for DiGiorno pizza, Oberto beef jerky, the Airborne Athletics basketball training device Dr. Dish, GEICO and Hooters restaurants.
Appearing in early 1990s Taco Bell TV ads promoting the 7-layer burrito, Vitale exclaimed, "It's 'Sevendipity,' baby !!

Films and television
In 1988, Vitale had a cameo appearance as a baseball color commentator, sharing the crowded broadcast booth with Curt Gowdy, Jim Palmer, Dick Enberg, Mel Allen, Tim McCarver and Joyce Brothers in The Naked Gun: From the Files of Police Squad!. He guest starred on The Cosby Show along with friend Jim Valvano as furniture movers in the eighth-season episode The Getaway. Other film appearances have generally been Vitale playing himself and commentating the fictional games occurring in those films.

Film roles
The Naked Gun: From the Files of Police Squad! (1988) – Baseball Announcer #1
Blue Chips (1994) – Himself
Jury Duty (1995) – Hal Gibson
The Sixth Man (1997) – Himself
He Got Game (1998) – Himself
Love & Basketball (2000) – Himself
Complete Guide to Guys (2005) – Himself
Home of the Giants (2007) – Himself
Kick Buttowski: Suburban Daredevil  (2012) – Viking Mayor

Personal life
Vitale married Lorraine McGrath in 1971.  The couple have two daughters, Terri and Sherri, and five grandchildren. He has lived in Lakewood Ranch, Florida in the greater Tampa Bay area since the 1990s and has become a well-known fan of the Tampa Bay Buccaneers, Lightning, and Rays. He is a Roman Catholic.

In August 2021, Vitale announced that he was undergoing treatment to remove melanoma that had been discovered by doctors. In October of the same year, Vitale also announced that his doctors had diagnosed him with lymphoma which he would seek treatment to combat. In January 2022, ESPN announced Vitale would not commentate any more college basketball games that season.

Publications
Vitale has authored fourteen books, including:

 Dickie V's ABCs and 1-2-3s, Ascend Books (October 2010)
 Living a Dream: Reflections on 25 Years Sitting in the Best Seat, Champaign, IL Sports Publishing LLC (January 1, 2003)
 Dick Vitale's Fabulous 50 Players and Moments in College Basketball: From the Best Seat in the House During My 30 Years at ESPN, Ascend Books (October 6, 2008)
 Time Out Baby!, Berkley (December 1, 1992)
 Vitale, Simon and Schuster; 1st Edition (1988)
 Dickie V's Top 40 All-Everything Teams, Masters Press (June 1994)
 Tourney Time: It's Awesome Baby!, Masters Press (December 1993)
 Holding Court: Reflections on the Game I Love, Masters Press (November 1995)
 Campus Chaos: Why the Game I Love Is Breaking My Heart, Sideline Sports Publishing (December 1999)
 Getting a W in the Game of Life: Using My T.E.A.M. Model to Motivate, Elevate, and Be Great (Oct. 2012)
Dick Vitale's Mount Rushmores of College Basketball; Nico 11 Publishing (2018)
 The Lost Season: A Look at What the Journey to the 2020 National Championship Could Have Been (June 2020)

References

External links
 Dick Vitale Online
 Vitale's "V-File" at ESPN.com
 

1939 births
Living people
American men's basketball coaches
American people of Italian descent
American Roman Catholics
Basketball coaches from New Jersey
College basketball announcers in the United States
Detroit Pistons head coaches
Detroit Mercy Titans athletic directors
Detroit Mercy Titans men's basketball coaches
East Rutherford High School alumni
High school basketball coaches in New Jersey
Indiana Pacers announcers
Naismith Memorial Basketball Hall of Fame inductees
National Collegiate Basketball Hall of Fame inductees
People from East Rutherford, New Jersey
People from Elmwood Park, New Jersey
Rutgers Scarlet Knights men's basketball coaches
Seton Hall University alumni
Sportspeople from Passaic, New Jersey
William Paterson University alumni
Writers from New Jersey